John Carpenter Carter (December 19, 1837 – December 10, 1864) was an American lawyer who became Brigadier General of the Confederate States Army during the American Civil War, and died of wounds received at the Battle of Franklin, Tennessee.

Early life, education and legal career
John Carpenter Carter was born in Waynesboro, Georgia on December 19, 1837 to Angelina Carter and her husband, Dr. Edward J. Carter (1814-1869). By 1850, his elder brother Isiah had died so John was the family's eldest son, with three younger sisters, although another brother Alexander would survive his parents. His father owned 52 slaves in 1850: 25 males and 27 females.

John Carpenter Carter attended the University of Virginia from 1854 to 1856, then studied law under Judge Abram Carruthers at Cumberland University in Lebanon, Tennessee. He became an instructor at the school after graduating, and married the judge's daughter. He was practicing law in Memphis, Tennessee when the Civil War began.

Civil War service
Carter entered the war as a captain in the 38th Tennessee Infantry Regiment and quickly became its colonel. He commanded the regiment during the Battle of Shiloh, Battle of Perryville, Battle of Stones River, Battle of Chickamauga and Atlanta Campaign. Carter was promoted to brigadier general to rank from July 7, 1864. He temporarily commanded a division at the Battle of Jonesboro.

Aftermath

Brigadier General John C. Carter was buried at Rose Hill Cemetery, Columbia, Tennessee. The Brigadier General John Carpenter Carter Camp 207, Sons of Confederate Veterans in Waynesboro, Georgia, is named for General Carter.

See also
 List of American Civil War generals (Confederate)

Notes

References
 Eicher, John H., and David J. Eicher, Civil War High Commands. Stanford: Stanford University Press, 2001. .
 Sifakis, Stewart. Who Was Who in the Civil War. New York: Facts On File, 1988. .
 Warner, Ezra J. Generals in Gray: Lives of the Confederate Commanders. Baton Rouge: Louisiana State University Press, 1959. .

External links
 
 Photo of John C Carter Winstead Hill Monument

1837 births
1864 deaths
People from Waynesboro, Georgia
University of Tennessee alumni
Confederate States Army generals
Confederate States of America military personnel killed in the American Civil War